Hassan Baraka (born April 10, 1987 in Tetouan) is a Moroccan open water swimmer. 

In 2014, Baraka became the first person to swim across the Gulf of Aqaba, subsequently setting a Guinness World Record for "fastest time to swim the length of the Aqaba Gulf" (8 hours, 30 minutes, 42 seconds). He is also the youngest Moroccan to swim across the Strait of Gibraltar (4 hours 1 minute) and the first Moroccan to complete the World Marathon.

References

1987 births
Living people
Moroccan male swimmers